Ignace Rene Louisa Valentinus Meuwissen (born 29 July 1965) is a Belgian real estate entrepreneur. He is known as an advisor for wealthy Russian-speaking clientele, particularly among Russian oligarchs.

Career
At the age of 25, Meuwissen started his real estate business and in 2008 established the company Property4East with his wife, Naomi El Haimer.

In 2014, Meuwissen resigned as directory of Property4East and was renamed Media & Internet Communications, the company went bankrupt in 2018.

Philanthropy
Since 2015, Meuwissen has annually supported Kamaliya's foundation to help children in need. The foundation organizes annual charity nights to raise money.

June 2022, Meuwissen organized "Care For Ukraine" to support Kamaliya & Mohammad Zahoor. The event was hosted at The Flying Group Antwerp International Airport in collaboration with Arne Quinze, Edmond de Rothschild Group, Gert Voorjans, Piet Stockmans and Rolls-Royce. The event raised in total of 285,000,-EURO.

References

External links

1965 births
Living people
Belgian businesspeople
Businesspeople in real estate